Johnny Perry (October 24, 1972 – November 21, 2002) was a professional strongman competitor and professional wrestler from Zebulon, North Carolina, US. Perry finished fourth in the 2002 World's Strongest Man competition.

Death
A few months after the 2002 World's Strongest Man Championship, Perry died abruptly on November 21, 2002, from heart failure due to enormous size caused by steroid use. He was ranked fourth in the world by the International Federation of Strength Athletes at the time of his death.

References

1972 births
2002 deaths
American strength athletes
People from Zebulon, North Carolina
Professional wrestlers from North Carolina